San Pedro de la Paz is a Chilean city and commune located in the Concepción Province, Biobío Region. It has some 80,447 inhabitants according to the 2002 national census. In 2005, the Pedro Aguirre Cerda avenue, the main avenue in the city, was completed. Most of the inhabitants of this comuna commute daily to Concepción – either by car, bus or train – over the Biobío River. It is considered to be part of Greater Concepción conurbation.

San Pedro was established during the Conquest of Chile first as fort la Candelaria which was destroyed following the death of Governor Martín García Óñez de Loyola in 1599.  It was rebuilt as part of La Frontera by Alonso de Ribera as fort San Pedro de la Paz in 1603.  A small settlement grew up around it.  During the Chilean War of Independence the town was burned in 1821, by the royalist Juan Manuel Picó on the order of Vicente Benavides during the Battle of San Pedro.  The fort was ruined by the 1835 Concepción earthquake.

Demographics 
Of these, 80,159 (99.6%) lived in urban areas and 288 (0.4%) in rural areas. The population grew by 18.6% (12,630 persons) between the 1992 and 2002 censuses.

Administration 
As a commune, San Pedro de la Paz is a third-level administrative division of Chile administered by a municipal council, headed by an alcalde who is directly elected every four years. The 2008–2012 alcalde is Audito Retamal Lazo (Ind.).

Within the electoral divisions of Chile, San Pedro de la Paz is represented in the Chamber of Deputies by José Miguel Ortiz (PDC) and Enrique Van Rysselberghe (UDI) as part of the 44th electoral district, (together with Concepción and Chiguayante). The commune is represented in the Senate by Alejandro Navarro Brain (MAS) and Hosain Sabag Castillo (PDC) as part of the 12th senatorial constituency (Biobío-Cordillera).

References 

 Diccionario geográfico de la República de Chile, SEGUNDA EDICIÓN CORREGIDA Y AUMENTADA, NUEVA YORK, D. APPLETON Y COMPAÑÍA. 1899.  pg. 721 San Pedro de Bío-Bío  Francisco Solano Asta Buruaga y Cienfuegos

External links 
 Municipality of San Pedro de la Paz

Communes of Chile
Populated places in Concepción Province
1599 establishments in the Spanish Empire
Coasts of Biobío Region
Populated coastal places in Chile